William Wolfskill (1798–1866) was an American-Mexican pioneer, cowboy, and agronomist in Los Angeles, California beginning in the 1830s. He had earned money for land in a decade as a fur trapper near Santa Fe, New Mexico, where he had become a Mexican citizen. This enabled him to own land in California.

Wolfskill was highly influential in the development of California's agricultural industry in the 19th century, establishing an expanded viticulture and becoming the largest wine producer in the region. One of the wealthiest men for his time, he expanded his holdings, running sheep and cultivating oranges, lemons and other crops. He is credited with establishing the state's citrus industry and developing the Valencia orange. It became the most popular juice orange in the United States and was the origin of the name of Valencia, California.

With his brother John Reid Wolfskill, in 1842 William bought a large parcel in the Sacramento Valley; they called this Rancho Rio de los Putos, later known as the Wolfskill Ranch. The brothers later divided this land, near what is now Winters, California. There John Wolfskill established orchards and vineyards. Three other Wolfskill brothers migrated to California, working first with John in the north.

History
Wolfskill moved to New Mexico in 1821, while the region was a province of Mexico called Santa Fe de Nuevo México. He spent ten years fur trapping in the New Mexico area, as the fur trade was highly lucrative and he could put together a stake for his future. In 1828 he became a naturalized Mexican citizen.

Wolfskill left Taos, New Mexico, in September 1830 with a party of mountain men that included George C. Yount. When they arrived in Southern California in early 1831 (using the trail Jedediah Smith had mapped across the Mojave desert), Wolfskill and Yount went to the coast to hunt sea otter. Wolfskill eventually returned to Southern California while Yount decided to go north, and the two parted company. Yount settled in the Napa Valley.

As a naturalized citizen of Mexico, Wolfskill was allowed to own land and bought a parcel where downtown Los Angeles later developed. He began to cultivate grapevines for wine. He eventually planted 32,000 vines on a 48-acre vineyard. Initially, he planted mission vines, which had been introduced by the Spanish missionaries. He expanded his plantings to include other varietals later.

In May 1842 Wolfskill was awarded a large land grant in that area that developed as Winters, California in what is now Yolo County. His younger brother John joined him, and they named the property Rancho Rio de los Putos, after a nearby creek. The name was derived by Spanish colonists from Lake Miwok puṭa wuwwe, meaning "grassy creek."

The property was later known as the Wolfskill Ranch. John Wolfskill established orchards and vineyards. Three younger Wolfskill brothers, Milton, Mathus, and Satchal, also migrated to that region, settling and working with John. He and William Wolfskill later divided this land, near what is now Winters, California in the Sacramento Valley. 

By his death in 1866 in Los Angeles, William Wolfskill was producing 50,000 gallons of wine a year. He was, by far, the greatest producer of table grapes in California during the Mexican era. He has been ranked by historians as one of the three most important men in the history of California viticulture.  Wolfskill's neighbor, friend, and business rival in the tiny pueblo of Los Angeles, was French immigrant Jean-Louis Vignes.

For his time, Wolfskill was one of the wealthiest men in Southern California. He owned large tracts of land throughout the region, which he used for everything from running sheep to cultivating orange groves. He developed the Valencia orange, which became the most popular juice orange in the United States and was widely cultivated in southern California. It was the origin of the name of Valencia, California.

Wolfskill is credited with developing and building the first schooner in California. 

John Bidwell, another early American pioneer in California, notes Wolfskill in his memoir as among European Americans he knew in early Mexican Los Angeles: 
Los Angeles I first saw in March, 1845. It then had probably two hundred and fifty people [referring to non-Native Americans only], of whom I recall Don Abel Stearns, John Temple, Captain Alexander Bell, William Wolfskill, Lemuel Carpenter, David W. Alexander; also of Mexicans, Pio Pico (governor), Don Juan Bandini, and others.

References

Further reading

External links
Mojave Desert.net: William Wolfskill biography website

California pioneers
American agriculturalists
American agronomists
American winemakers
American viticulturists
Land owners from California
1798 births
1866 deaths
Businesspeople from Los Angeles
Businesspeople from Kentucky
American emigrants to Mexico
Naturalized citizens of Mexican California
History of Los Angeles
History of Los Angeles County, California
History of Orange County, California
Orange production
Wine merchants
People from Madison County, Kentucky
People from Winters, California
People in 19th-century California
19th-century American businesspeople
19th century in Los Angeles